St. Lino Science High School (SLSHS), formerly known as Young Rac Science High School, is a private non-sectarian school in Metro Manila located at 478 Manga Ave., Sampaloc, Manila. It was founded in 2005 by Korean missionaries to the Philippines led by Rev. Paulino C. Choi, who had established what became the Manila Theological College in 1987.

Campus
In 2013, Manila Theological College built a 10-story building for itself, which is shares with SLSHS and the MTC College of Medicine. 

Education in Sampaloc, Manila
Science high schools in Manila
Educational institutions established in 2005
2005 establishments in the Philippines